Grand Manan Airport  is located  northwest of Grand Harbour on the island of Grand Manan, New Brunswick, Canada.

The airport is classified as an airport of entry by Nav Canada and is staffed by the Canada Border Services Agency (CBSA). CBSA officers at this airport can handle general aviation aircraft only, with no more than 15 passengers.

Lighting for night landings is activated through VHF airband radio at 123.20 MHz.

References

Registered aerodromes in New Brunswick
Transport in Charlotte County, New Brunswick
Buildings and structures in Charlotte County, New Brunswick